The 2016 Chicago White Sox season was the club's 117th season in Chicago and 116th in the American League. The White Sox wore a black diamond patch on the uniform in honor of the late Eddie Einhorn, minority owner of the team. Despite a strong start by the team, they finished the season in fourth place in the AL Central.

The White Sox tied a major league record for most home runs by a losing team when they hit seven homers in a 10–8 defeat to Toronto on June 25.

Regular season

Season standings

American League Central

American League Wild Card

Record against opponents

Game log

|-style="background:#bfb"
| 1 || April 4 || @ Athletics || 9:05PM || 4–3 || Sale (1–0) || Hill (0–1) || Robertson (1) || 1–0 || 35,067 || W1
|-style="background:#bfb"
| 2 || April 5 || @ Athletics || 9:05PM || 5–4 || Jones (1–0)  || Doolittle (0–1)  || Robertson (2) || 2–0 || 10,478 || W2
|-style="background:#fbb"
| 3 || April 6 || @ Athletics || 9:05PM || 1–2 || Gray (1–0) || Rodon (0–1) || Madson (1) || 2–1 || 16.468 || L1
|-style="background:#bfb"
| 4 || April 7 || @ Athletics || 2:35PM || 6–1 || Latos (1–0) || Graveman (0–1) || — || 3–1 || 12,577 || W1
|-style="background:#fbb"
| 5 || April 8 || Indians || 3:10PM || 1–7 ||  Salazar (1–0)|| Danks (0–1) || — || 3–2 || 38,019 || L1
|-style="background:#bfb"
| 6 || April 9 || Indians || 1:10PM || 7–3 || Sale (2–0) || Shaw (0–1) || — || 4–2 || 20,192 || W1
|-style="background:#bbb"
| — || April 10 || Indians || 1:10PM || colspan="7" | Postponed (rain) (Resceduled for May 23)
|-style="background:#bfb"
| 7 || April 11 || @ Twins || 3:10PM || 4–1 || Quintana (1–0) || Gibson (0–2) || Robertson (3) || 5–2 || 40,638 || W2
|-style="background:#bfb"
| 8 || April 13 || @ Twins || 7:10PM || 3–0 || Rodon (1–1) || Hughes (0–2) || Robertson (4) || 6–2 || 21,008 || W3
|-style="background:#bfb"
| 9 || April 14 || @ Twins || 12:10PM || 3–1 || Latos (2–0) || Santana (0–1) || Robertson (5) || 7–2 || 19,736 || W4
|-style="background:#bfb"
| 10 || April 15 || @ Rays || 6:10PM || 1–0 || Sale (3–0) || Colomé (1–1) || — || 8–2 || 16,801 || W5
|-style="background:#fbb"
| 11 || April 16 || @ Rays || 5:10PM || 2–7 || Ramírez (2–0) || Danks (0–2) || — || 8–3 || 30,451 || L1
|-style="background:#fbb"
| 12 || April 17 || @ Rays || 12:10PM || 2–3 || Moore (1–0) || Quintana (1–1) || Colomé (1) || 8–4 || 21,810 || L2
|-style="background:#fbb"
| 13 || April 18 || Angels || 7:10PM || 0–7 || Santiago (1–0) || Rodon (1–2) || — || 8–5 || 14,706 || L3
|-style="background:#bfb"
| 14 || April 19 || Angels || 7:10PM || 5–0 || Latos (3–0) || Shoemaker (1–2)  || Jones (1) || 9–5 || 12,093 || W1
|-style="background:#bfb"
| 15 || April 20 || Angels || 1:10PM || 2–1 || Sale (4–0) || Richards (0–3)  || Robertson (6) || 10–5 || 12,785 || W2
|-style="background:#fbb"
| 16 || April 21 || Angels || 1:10PM || 2–3 || Weaver (2-0)  || Danks (0-3)  || Street (4) || 10–6 || 11,418 || L1
|-style="background:#bfb"
| 17 || April 22 || Rangers || 7:10PM || 5–0 || Quintana (2-1)  || Pérez (0-2) || — || 11–6 || 15,486 || W1
|-style="background:#bfb"
| 18 || April 23 || Rangers || 1:10PM || 4–3 (11) || Albers (1-0) || Martinez (0-1) || — || 12–6 || 20,182 || W2
|-style="background:#bfb"
| 19 || April 24 || Rangers || 1:10PM || 4–1 || Latos (4-0) || Holland (2-1) || Robertson (7) || 13–6 || 26,058 || W3
|-style="background:#bfb"
| 20 || April 25 || @ Blue Jays || 6:07PM || 7–5 || Putnam (1–0) || Cecil (0–4) || Robertson (8) || 14–6 || 24,333 || W4
|-style="background:#bfb"
| 21 || April 26 || @ Blue Jays || 6:07PM || 10–1 || Sale (5–0) || Dickey (1–3) || — || 15–6 || 23,726 || W5
|-style="background:#bfb"
| 22 || April 27 || @ Blue Jays || 6:07PM || 4–0 || Quintana (3–1) || Estrada (1–2) || — || 16–6 || 28,759 || W6
|-style="background:#fbb"
| 23 || April 28 || @ Orioles || 6:05PM || 2–10 || Givens (2–0)  || Danks (0–4) || — || 16–7 || 14,568 || L1
|-style="background:#fbb"
| 24 || April 29 || @ Orioles || 6:05PM || 3–6 || Brach (3–0)  || Rodon (1–3) || Britton (6) || 16–8 || 19,912 || L2
|-style="background:#bfb"
| 25 || April 30 || @ Orioles || 6:05PM || 8–7 || Jones (2–0)  || Britton (1–1) || — || 17–8 || 29,152 || W1
|-

|-style="background:#bfb"
| 26 || May 1 || @ Orioles || 12:35PM || 7–1 || Sale (6–0) || Jiménez (1–3) || — || 18–8 || 28,803 || W2
|-style="background:#bfb"
| 27 || May 3 || Red Sox || 7:10PM || 4–1 || Quintana (4–1) || Wright (2–3) || Robertson (9) || 19–8 || 15,025 || W3
|-style="background:#fbb"
| 28 || May 4 || Red Sox || 7:10PM || 2–5 || Buchholz (1–3)|| Rodon (1–4) || Kimbrel (9) || 19–9 || 14,383 || L1
|-style="background:#fbb"
| 29 || May 5 || Red Sox || 7:10PM || 3–7 || Barnes (2–1) || Johnson (0–1) || — || 19–10 || 20,126 || L2
|-style="background:#bfb"
| 30 || May 6 || Twins || 7:10PM || 10–4 || Latos (5–0) || Nolasco (1–1)|| — || 20–10 || 23,054 || W1
|-style="background:#bfb"
| 31 || May 7 || Twins || 6:10PM || 7–2 || Sale (7–0) || Santana (0–2) || — || 21–10 || 28,049 || W2
|-style="background:#bfb"
| 32 || May 8 || Twins || 1:10PM || 3–1 || Quintana (5–1) || Duffey (0–2) || Robertson (10) || 22–10 || 23,801 || W3
|-style="background:#bfb"
| 33 || May 9 || @ Rangers || 7:05PM || 8–4 (12)|| Jennings (1–0) || Ramos (0–2) || — || 23–10 || 22,958 || W4
|-style="background:#fbb"
| 34 || May 10 || @ Rangers || 7:05PM || 11–13 || Claudio (1–0) || Albers (1–1) || Tolleson (11) || 23–11 || 25,804 || L1
|-style="background:#fbb"
| 35 || May 11 || @ Rangers || 1:05PM || 5–6 || Barnette (2–2)  || Jennings (1–1)  || Dyson (1) || 23–12 || 29,023 || L2
|-style="background:#bfb"
| 36 || May 13 || @ Yankees || 6:05PM || 7–1 ||  Sale (8-0) || Severino (0-6) || — ||24–12|| 34,264|| W1
|-style="background:#fbb"
| 37 || May 14 || @ Yankees || 12:05PM || 1–2 || Nova (2–1) || Quintana (5–2) || Chapman (2) || 24–13 || 39,691 || L1
|-style="background:#fbb"
| 38 || May 15 || @ Yankees || 12:05PM || 5–7 || Betances (1–2) || Albers (1–2)|| Chapman (3) || 24–14 || 41,979 || L2
|-style="background:#fbb"
| 39 || May 17 || Astros || 7:10PM || 5–6 (11)|| Neshek (1–0) || Albers (1–3) || Sipp (1) || 24–15 || 13,481 || L3
|-style="background:#fbb"
| 40 || May 18 || Astros || 7:10PM || 3–5 || Fister (4–3) || Latos (5–1) || Gregerson (9) || 24–16 || 14,936 || L4
|-style="background:#bfb"
| 41 || May 19 || Astros || 7:10PM || 2–1 || Sale (9–0) || McHugh (4–4) || — || 25–16 || 20,096 || W1
|-style="background:#fbb"
| 42 || May 20 || Royals || 7:10PM || 1–4 || Gee (1–1) || Quintana (5–3) || Davis (10) || 25–17 || 24,020 || L1
|-style="background:#fbb"
| 43 || May 21 || Royals || 1:10PM || 1–2 || Soria (2–1) || González (0–1) || Davis (11) || 25–18 || 27,631 || L2
|-style="background:#bfb"
| 44 || May 22 || Royals || 1:10PM || 3–2 || Rodon (2–4) || Ventura (4–3) || Robertson (11) || 26–18 || 34,526 || W1
|-style="background:#bfb"
| 45 || May 23 || Indians || 4:10PM || 7–6 || Latos (6–1) || Clevinger (0–1) || Robertson (12)|| 27–18 || — ||W2
|-style="background:#fbb"
| 46 || May 23 || Indians || 7:10PM || 1–5 || Anderson (1–3) || Johnson (0–2) || — || 27–19 || 18,323 || L1
|-style="background:#fbb"
| 47 || May 24 || Indians || 7:10PM || 2–6 || Tomlin (7–0) || Sale (9–1) || — || 27–20 || 21,550 || L2
|-style="background:#fbb"
| 48 || May 25 || Indians || 1:10PM || 3–4 || Kluber (4–5) || Quintana (5–4) || Allen (11) || 27–21 || 22,561 || L3
|-style="background:#bbb"
|— || May 26 || @ Royals || 7:15PM || colspan=7| Postponed (rain) (Resceduled for Sept 19, 2016)
|-style="background:#fbb"
|49|| May 27 || @ Royals || 7:15PM || 5–7 || Moylan (2–0) || Albers (1–4) || Davis (13) || 27–22 || 28,508 || L4
|-style="background:#fbb"
|50|| May 28 || @ Royals || 1:15PM || 7–8 || Chien-Ming Wang (3–0) || Kahnle (0–1) || — || 27–23 ||  || L5
|-style="background:#fbb"
|51|| May 29 || @ Royals || 1:15PM || 4–5 || Young (2–5) || Jones (2–1) || Davis (14) || 27–24 || 36,624 || L6
|-style="background:#fbb"
|52|| May 30 || @ Mets || 12:10PM || 0–1 || Harvey (4–7) || Quintana (5–5) || Familia (17) || 27–25 || 38,339 || L7
|-style="background:#bfb"
|53|| May 31 || @ Mets || 6:10PM || 6–4 || Jennings (2–1) || Robles (0–3) || Robertson (13) || 28–25 || 32,781 || W1
|-

|-style="background:#bfb"
| 54 || June 1 || @ Mets || 12:10PM || 2–1 (13) || Albers (2–4) || Verrett (3–3)|| — || 29–25 || 34,160 || W2
|-style="background:#fbb"
| 55 || June 3 || @ Tigers || 6:10PM || 3–10 || Zimmermann (8–2) || Rodon (2–5)|| — || 29–26 || 31,184 || L1
|-style="background:#fbb"
| 56 || June 4 || @ Tigers || 3:10PM || 4–7 || Pelfrey (1–5) || Sale (9–2) ||Rodríguez (16) || 29–27 || 32,916 || L2
|-style="background:#fbb"
| 57 || June 5 || @ Tigers || 12:10PM || 2–5 || Verlander (5–5) || Quintana (5–6) || Rodríguez (17) || 29–28 || 29,086 || L3
|-style="background:#fbb"
| 58 || June 7 || Nationals || 7:10PM || 5–10 || Treinen (4–1) || Latos (6–2) || — || 29–29 || 18,812 || L4
|-style="background:#fbb"
| 59 || June 8 || Nationals || 7:10PM || 4–11 || Scherzer (7–4) || Shields (2–8) || — || 29–30 || 15,273 || L5
|-style="background:#bfb"
| 60 || June 9 || Nationals || 7:10PM || 3–1  || González (1–1) || González (3-5) || Robertson (14) || 30–30 || 20,014 || W1
|-style="background:#bfb"
| 61 || June 10 || Royals || 7:10PM || 7–5 || Sale (10–2)|| Kennedy (4–5) || Robertson (15) || 31–30 || 23,900 || W2
|-style="background:#fbb"
| 62 || June 11 || Royals || 1:10PM || 1–4 || Duffy (2–1) || Quintana (5–7) || — || 31–31 || 31,183 || L1
|-style="background:#fbb"
| 63 || June 12 || Royals || 1:10PM || 1–3 || Ventura (5–4) || Rodon (2–6) || Davis (17) || 31–32 || 30,363 ||L2
|-style="background:#bfb"
| 64 || June 13 || Tigers || 7:10PM || 10–9 (12)|| Duke (1–0) || Sánchez (3–7) || — || 32–32 || 16,314 || W1
|-style="background:#fbb"
| 65 || June 14 || Tigers || 7:10PM || 8–11 || Zimmermann (9–3) || González (1–2) || — || 32–33 || 17,403 || L1
|-style="background:#bfb"
| 66 || June 15 || Tigers || 7:10PM || 5–3 || Sale (11–2) || Pelfrey (1–7) || Robertson (16) || 33–33 || 20,292 || W1
|-style="background:#fbb"
| 67 || June 17 || @ Indians || 6:10PM || 2–3 || Allen (2–3) || Jones (2–2) || — || 33–34 || 27,912 || L1
|-style="background:#fbb"
| 68 || June 18 || @ Indians || 5:10PM || 2–13 || Salazar (8–3) || Shields (2–9) || — || 33–35 || 31,066 || L2
|-style="background:#fbb"
| 69 || June 19 || @ Indians || 12:10PM || 2–3 ||Otero (2–0)  || Robertson (0–1) || — || 33–36 || 25,269 || L3
|-style="background:#bfb"
| 70 || June 20 || @ Red Sox || 6:10PM || 3–1 || Duke (2–0) || Kimbrel (0–3) || Robertson (17) || 34–36 || 36,291 || W1
|-style="background:#bfb"
| 71 || June 21 || @ Red Sox || 6:10PM || 3–1 || Sale (12–2) || Buchholz (3–7) || Robertson (18) || 35–36 || 36,554 || W2
|-style="background:#bfb"
| 72 || June 22 || @ Red Sox || 6:10PM || 8–6 || Jennings (3–1) || Uehara (2–2) || Duke (1) || 36–36 || 37,413 || W3
|-style="background:#fbb"
| 73 || June 23 || @ Red Sox || 12:35PM || 7–8 (10)|| Kimbrel (1–3) || Purke (0–1) || — || 36–37 || 37,790 || L1
|-style="background:#bfb"
| 74 || June 24 || Blue Jays || 7:10PM || 3–2 || Jones (3–2) || Chavez (0–2) || Robertson (19) || 37–37 || 27,196 || W1
|-style="background:#fbb"
| 75 || June 25 || Blue Jays || 1:10PM || 8–10 || Dickey (5–8) || González (1–3) || Osuna (15) || 37–38 || 25,776 || L1
|-style="background:#bfb"
| 76 || June 26 || Blue Jays || 1:10PM || 5–2 || Sale (13–2) || Stroman (6–4) || Robertson (20) || 38–38 || 28,345 || W1
|-style="background:#fbb"
| 77 || June 28 || Twins || 7:10PM || 0–4 || Gibson (1–5) || Quintana (5–8) || — || 38–39 ||22,072 ||L1
|-style="background:#bfb"
| 78 || June 29 || Twins || 7:10PM || 6–9 || Shields (3–9) || Nolasco (3–6) || Jones (2) || 39–39 ||18,571 ||W1 
|-style="background:#bfb"
| 79 || June 30 || Twins || 1:10PM || 5–6 || Jones (4–2) || Abad (1–2) || Robertson (21) || 40–39 ||26,158 ||W2 
|-

|-style="background:#fbb"
| 80 || July 1 || @ Astros || 7:10PM || 0–5 || Mike Fiers (6-3)|| Miguel González (1-4) || — || 40–40 || 31,965 || L1
|-style="background:#bfb"
| 81 || July 2 || @ Astros || 3:10PM || 7–6 || Sale (14–2) || Fister (8–5) || — || 41–40 || 35,116 || W1
|-style="background:#bfb"
| 82 || July 3 || @ Astros || 1:10PM || 4–1 || Quintana (6–8) || McHugh (5–6) || Robertson (23) || 42–40 || 30,379 || W2
|-style="background:#bfb"
| 83 || July 4 || Yankees || 1:10PM || 8–2 ||Shields (4–9)|| Sabathia (5–6) || — || 43–40 || 30,955 || W3
|-style="background:#fbb"
| 84 || July 5 || Yankees || 7:10PM || 0–9 || Tanaka (6–2) || Rodon (2–7) || — || 43–41 || 20,773 || L1
|-style="background:#bfb"
| 85 || July 6 || Yankees || 7:10PM || 5–0 ||  González (2–4)||Pineda (3–8)|| — || 44–41 ||  21,144|| W1
|-style="background:#fbb"
| 86 || July 8 || Braves || 7:10PM || 8-11 || Wisler (4–8) || Sale (14–3) || — || 44–42 || 26,199 || L1
|-style="background:#bfb"
| 87 || July 9 || Braves || 1:10PM || 5–4 ||  Quintana (7–8) ||  Teherán (3–8)
|| Jones (3) || 45–42 ||  23,888
|| W1
|-style="background:#fbb"
| 88 || July 10 || Braves || 1:10PM || 0–2 || Foltynewicz (3–3) || Shields (4–10) || Johnson (2) || 45–43 || 29,156 || L1
|- style="text-align:center; background:#bbcaff;"
| colspan="11" | 87th All-Star Game in San Diego, California
|-style="background:#fbb"
| 89 || July 15 || @ Angels || 9:05PM || 0–7 ||Santiago (7–4)||González (2–5)|| — || 45–44 ||42,031|| L2
|-style="background:#fbb"
| 90 || July 16 || @ Angels || 8:05PM || 0–1 ||Shoemaker (5–9)||Shields (4–11)|| — || 45–45 ||39,620|| L3
|-style="background:#fbb"
| 91 || July 17 || @ Angels || 2:35PM || 1–8 ||Weaver (8–7)||Turner (0–1)|| — || 45–46 || 36,834 || L4
|-style="background:#fbb"
| 92 || July 18 || @ Mariners || 9:10PM || 3–4 ||Rollins (1–0)||Robertson (0–2)|| — || 45–47 || 20,598||L5 
|-style="background:#bfb"
| 93 || July 19 || @ Mariners || 9:10PM || 6–1 || Quintana (8–8) || Miley (6–7) || — || 46–47 || 24,851 ||W1 
|-style="background:#fbb"
| 94 || July 20 || @ Mariners || 2:40PM || 5–6 (11) || Nuño (1–1) || Jennings (3–2) || — || 46–48 || 39,985 || L1
|-style="background:#fbb"
| 95 || July 21 || Tigers || 7:10PM || 1–2 (7) || Pelfrey (3–9) || Shields (4–12) || — || 46–49 || 24,938 || L2
|-style="background:#fbb"
| 96 || July 22 || Tigers || 7:10PM ||5–7||Ryan (4–2)||Fulmer (0–1)||Rodríguez (27)||46–50||22,611||L3
|-style="background:#bfb"
| 97 || July 23 || Tigers || 6:10PM ||4–3 ||Robertson (1–2)||Wilson (2–3)||—|| 47–50|| 32,527||W1
|-style="background:#bfb"
| 98 || July 24 || Tigers || 1:10PM || 5–4 || Robertson (2–2) || Rondón (3–2) || — || 48–50 || 30,281 || W2
|-style="background:#bfb"
| 99 || July 25 || Cubs || 7:10PM || 5–4 ||  Jennings (4–2)||Montgomery (3–5)|| — || 49–50 || 39,510 || W3
|-style="background:#bfb"
| 100 || July 26 || Cubs || 7:10PM || 3–0 || Shields (5–12) || Hendricks (9–7) || Robertson (24) || 50–50 || 39,553 || W4 
|-style="background:#fbb"
| 101|| July 27 || @ Cubs || 7:05PM || 1–8 || Hammel (10–5) || Ranaudo (1–1) || — || 50–51 || 41,166 || L1
|-style="background:#fbb"
| 102 || July 28 || @ Cubs || 7:05PM || 1–3 || Lackey (8–7) || Sale (14–4) || Chapman (21) || 50–52 || 41,157 ||L2 
|-style="background:#fbb"
| 103 || July 29 || @ Twins || 7:10PM || 1–2 || May (2–2) || Jennings (3–4) || — || 50–53 || 23,983 || L3
|-style="background:#bfb"
| 104 || July 30 || @ Twins || 6:10PM || 6–5 (10)|| Ynoa (1–0) || Abad (1–4) || Robertson (25) || 51–53 || 27,914 || W1
|-style="background:#fbb"
| 105 || July 31 || @ Twins || 1:10PM || 4–6 || Santana (4–9) || Rodon (2–8) || Pressly (1) || 51–54 || 29,670 ||L1
|-

|-style="background:#fbb"
| 106 || August 2 || @ Tigers || 6:10PM || 5–11 || Sánchez (6–11) || Shields (5–13) || — || 51–55 || 30,316 || L2
|-style="background:#fbb"
| 107 || August 3 || @ Tigers || 6:10PM || 1–2 || Greene (2–2) || Sale (14–5) || Rodríguez (30) || 51–56 || 32,546 ||L3
|-style="background:#bfb"
| 108 || August 4 || @ Tigers || 12:10PM || 6–3 || Quintana (9–8) || Zimmerman (9–5) || Robertson (26) || 52–56 || 33,023 || W1
|-style="background:#fbb"
| 109 || August 5 || Orioles || 7:10PM || 5–7 || Gallardo (4–3) || González (2–6) || Britton (34) || 52–57 || 26,553 ||L1
|-style="background:#bfb"
| 110 || August 6 || Orioles || 6:10PM || 4–2 || Jones (5–2) || Tillman (14–4) || Robertson (27) || 53–57 || 28,941 || W1
|-style="background:#fbb"
| 111 || August 7 || Orioles || 1:10PM || 2–10 || Bundy (5–3) || Shields (5–14) || Jiménez (1) || 53–58 || 31,040 || L1
|-style="background:#bfb"
| 112 || August 9 || @ Royals || 7:15PM || 7–5 (10)|| Robertson (3–2) || Herrera (1–4) || Jennings (1) || 54–58 || 27,134 || W1
|-style="background:#fbb"
| 113 || August 10 || @ Royals || 7:15PM || 2–3 (14) || Gee (4–5) || Albers (2–5) || — || 54–59 || 25,188 || L1
|-style="background:#fbb"
| 114 || August 11 || @ Royals || 7:15PM || 1–2 || Duffy (9–1) || Fulmer (0–2) || — || 54–60 || 34,310 || L2
|-style="background:#bfb"
| 115 || August 12 || @ Marlins || 6:10PM || 4–2 || Rodon (3–8) || Cashner (4–9) || Robertson (28) || 55-60 || 21,090 || W1
|-style="background:#bfb"
| 116 || August 13 || @ Marlins || 6:10PM || 9–8 || Beck (1–0) || Barraclough (6–3) || Robertson (29) || 56–60 || 20,006 || W2
|-style="background:#fbb"
| 117 || August 14 || @ Marlins || 12:10PM || 4–5 || Dunn (3–1) || Sale (14–6) || Rodney (20) || 56–61 || 21,401 || L1
|-style="background:#fbb"
| 118 || August 16 || @ Indians || 6:10PM || 1–3 || Kluber (13–8) || Quintana (9–9) || Allen (23) || 56–62 || 13,857 || L2
|-style="background:#bfb"
| 119 || August 17 || @ Indians || 6:10PM || 10–7 || Turner (1–1) || Allen (2–5) || Robertson (30) || 57–62 || 14,371 || W1
|-style="background:#fbb"
| 120 || August 18 || @ Indians || 6:10PM || 4–5 || Miller (7–1) || Turner (1–2) || — || 57–63 || 12,982 || L1
|-style="background:#fbb"
| 121 || August 19 || Athletics || 7:10PM || 0–9 || Graveman (9–8) || Shields (5–15) || — || 57–64 || 20,001 || L2
|-style="background:#bfb"
| 122 || August 20 || Athletics || 6:10PM || 6–2 || Sale (15–6) || Detwiler (1–2) || Robertson (31) || 58–64 || 21,178 || W1
|-style="background:#bfb"
| 123 || August 21 || Athletics || 1:10PM || 4–2 || Quintana (10–9) || Neal (2–3) || Robertson (32) || 59–64 || 23,030 || W2
|-style="background:#bfb"
| 124 || August 23 || Phillies || 7:10PM || 9–1 ||  Rodon (4–8)||Thompson (1–3)|| — || 60–64 || 18,843 || W3
|-style="background:#fbb"
| 125 || August 24 || Phillies || 7:10PM || 3–5 || Eickhoff (9–12) || Shields (5–16) || Gómez (34) || 60–65 || 15,630 || L1
|-style="background:#bfb"
| 126 || August 25 || Mariners || 7:10PM || 7–6 || Robertson (4–2) || Vincent (3–4) || — || 61–65 || 19,072 || W1
|-style="background:#fbb"
| 127 || August 26 || Mariners || 7:10PM || 1–3 ||  Hernández (9–4) || Sale (15–7) || Díaz (11) || 61–66 || 25,651 || L1
|-style="background:#bfb"
| 128 || August 27 || Mariners || 6:10PM || 9–3 || Quintana (11–9) || Miranda (1–1) || — || 62–66 || 27,318 || W1
|-style="background:#bfb"
| 129 || August 28 || Mariners || 1:10PM || 4–1 || Rodon (5–8) || Walker (4–9) || Robertson (33) || 63–66 || 25,538 || W2
|-style="background:#fbb"
| 130 || August 29 || @ Tigers || 6:10PM || 3–4 || Wilson (4–4) || Jones (5–3) || Rodríguez (37) || 63–67 || 27,201 || L1
|-style="background:#fbb"
| 131 || August 30 || @ Tigers || 6:10PM || 4–8 || Rondón (5–2) || Albers (2–6) || — || 63–68 || 27,121 || L2
|-style="background:#fbb"
| 132 || August 31 || @ Tigers || 12:10PM || 2–3 || Rodríguez (2–3) || Robertson (4–3) || — || 63–69 || 32,465 || L3
|-

|-style="background:#fbb"
| 133 || September 1 || @ Twins || 7:10PM || 5-8 || Santana (7-10) || Quintana (11-10) || Kintzler (13) || 63–70 || 20,329 || L4
|-style="background:#bfb"
| 134 || September 2 || @ Twins || 7:10PM || 11–4 || Rodon (6–8) || Gibson (5–9) || — || 64–70 || 20,806 || W1
|-style="background:#fbb"
| 135 || September 3 || @ Twins || 6:10PM || 3–11 || Santiago (11–8) || Shields (5–17) || — || 64–71 || 22,274 || L1
|-style="background:#bfb"
| 136 || September 4 || @ Twins || 1:10PM || 13–11 (12) || Minaya (1–0) || Dean (1–6)  || Kahnle (1) || 65–71 || 22,595 || W1
|-style="background:#fbb"
| 137 || September 5 || Tigers || 3:10PM || 3–5  (11) || Wilson (2–0) || Beck (1–1) || Rodríguez (39) || 65–72 || 18,653 || L1
|-style="background:#bfb"
| 138 || September 6 || Tigers || 7:10PM || 2–0 || González (3–6) || Boyd (5–3) || Robertson (34) || 66–72 || 15,155 || W1
|-style="background:#bfb"
| 139 || September 7 || Tigers || 1:10PM || 7–4 || Beck (2–1) || Greene (3–4) || Robertson (35) || 67–72 || 13,078 || W2
|-style="background:#bfb"
| 140 || September 9 || Royals || 7:10PM || 7–2 || Rodon (7–8) || Ventura (10–10) || — || 68–72 || 20,653 || W3
|-style="background:#fbb"
| 141 || September 10 || Royals || 6:10PM || 5–6 || McCarthy (1–0) || Beck (2–2) || Davis (23) || 68–73 || 20,148 || L1
|-style="background:#fbb"
| 142 || September 11 || Royals || 1:10PM || 0–2 || Kennedy (11–9) || Sale (15–8) || Davis (23) || 68–74 || 20,107 || L2
|-style="background:#bfb"
| 143 || September 12 || Indians || 7:10PM || 11–4 || González (4-6) || Carrasco (11–8) || — || 69–74 || 12,588 || W1 
|-style="background:#bfb"
| 144 || September 13 || Indians || 7:10PM || 8–1 || Quintana (12–10) || Bauer (11–7) || — || 70–74 || 15,588 || W2
|-style="background:#fbb"
| 145 || September 14 || Indians || 7:10PM || 1–6 || Tomlin (12–8) || Rodon (7–9) || — || 70–75 || 15,808 || L1
|-style="background:#bfb"
| 146 || September 15 || Indians || 1:10PM || 2–1 || Robertson (5–3) || Shaw (2–5) || — || 71–75 ||  || W1
|-style="background:#bfb"
| 147 || September 16 || @ Royals || 7:15PM || 7–4 || Sale (16–8) || Herrera (2–5) || — || 72–75 || 34,805 || W2
|-style="background:#fbb"
| 148 || September 17 || @ Royals || 6:15PM || 2–3 || Gee (7–8) || González (4–7) || Davis (25) || 72–76 || 34,982 || L1
|-style="background:#fbb"
| 149 || September 18 || @ Royals || 1:15PM || 3–10 || Duffy (12–2) || Quintana (12–11) || — || 72–77 || 31,502 || L2
|-style="background:#fbb"
| 150 || September 19 || @ Royals || 1:15PM || 3–8 || Ventura (11–11) || Rodon (7–10) || — || 72–78 || 31,502 || L3
|-style="background:#fbb"
| 151 || September 20 || @ Phillies || 6:05PM || 6-7 || Thompson (3-5) || Shields (5-18) || Mariot (1) || 72–79 || 16,069 || L4
|-style="background:#fbb"
| 152 || September 21 || @ Phillies || 6:05PM || 3–8 || Eickhoff (11–14) || Sale (16-9) || — || 72–80 || 21,703 || L5
|-style="background:#fbb"
| 153 || September 23 || @ Indians || 6:10PM || 4–10 || Bauer (12–8) || González (4–8) || — || 72–81 || 18,937 || L6
|-style="background:#bfb"
| 154 || September 24 || @ Indians || 6:10PM || 8–1 || Quintana (13–11) || Anderson (2–5) || — || 73–81 || 32,088 || W1 
|-style="background:#bfb"
| 155 || September 25 || @ Indians || 12:10PM || 3–0 || Rodon (8–10) || Tomlin (12–9) || Robertson (36) || 74–81 || 24,118 || W2
|-style="background:#bfb"
| 156 || September 26 || Rays || 7:10PM || 7–1 || Shields (6–18) || Smyly (7–12) || — || 75–81 || 13,665 || W3 
|-style="background:#bfb"
| 157 || September 27 || Rays || 7:10PM || 13–6 || Sale (17–9) || Cobb (1–2) || — || 76–81 || 14,798 || W4
|-style="background:#bfb"
| 158 || September 28 || Rays || 7:10PM || 1–0 || González (5–8) || Gamboa (0–2) || Robertson (37) || 77–81 || 12,976 || W5
|-style="background:#fbb"
| 159 || September 29 || Rays || 7:10PM || 3–5 || Archer (9–19) || Quintana (13–12) || Colomé (36) || 77–82 || 14,792 || L1 
|-style="background:#bfb"
| 160 || September 30 || Twins || 7:10PM || 7–3 || Rodon (9–10) || Duffey (9–12) || — || 78–82 || 19,007 || W1 
|-

|-style="background:#fbb"
| 161 || October 1 || Twins || 6:10PM || 0–6 || Santiago (13–10) || Shields (6–19) || — || 78–83 || 25,730 || L1 
|-style="background:#fbb"
| 162 || October 2 || Twins || 2:10PM || 3–6 || Berríos (3–7) || Sale (17–10) || Kintzler (17) || 78–84 || 21,904 || L2
|-

Personnel

Opening Day lineup

Roster

Statistics

Batting

Note: G = Games played; AB = At bats; R = Runs; H = Hits; 2B = Doubles; 3B = Triples; HR = Home runs; RBI = Runs batted in; Avg. = Batting average; OBP = On-base percentage; SLG = Slugging percentage; SB = Stolen bases

Pitching

Note: W = Wins; L = Losses; ERA = Earned run average; G = Games pitched; GS = Games started; SV = Saves; IP = Innings pitched; H = Hits allowed; R = Runs allowed; ER = Earned runs allowed; BB = Walks allowed; K = Strikeouts

Farm system

References

External links
2016 Chicago White Sox at Baseball Reference
2016 Chicago White Sox season Official Site
2016 Chicago White Sox season at ESPN

Chicago White Sox seasons
Chicago White Sox
White Sox